Titanotrichum is a genus of flowering plants belonging to the family Gesneriaceae.

Its native range is Southeastern China to Temperate Eastern Asia.

Species:
 Titanotrichum oldhamii (Hemsl.) Soler.

References

Gesnerioideae
Gesneriaceae genera